The Men's Freestyle flyweight at the 1968 Summer Olympics as part of the wrestling program were held at the Insurgentes Ice Rink. The flyweight was the lightest weight class, allowing wrestlers up to 52 kilograms.

Medalists

Tournament results 
The competition used a form of negative points tournament, with negative points given for any result short of a fall. Accumulation of 6 negative points eliminated the wrestler. When only two or three wrestlers remain, a special final round is used to determine the order of the medals.

Legend
TF — Won by Fall
DQ — Won by Passivity or forfeit
D2 — Both wrestlers lost by Passivity
DNA — Did not appear
TPP — Total penalty points
MPP — Match penalty points

Penalties
0 — Won by Fall and Disqualification
0.5 — Won by Technical Superiority
1 — Won by Points
2 — Draw
2.5 — Draw, Passivity
3 — Lost by Points
3.5 — Lost by Technical Superiority
4 — Lost by Fall and Disqualification

1st round

2nd round

3rd round

4th round

5th round

Final round 

Results from the preliminary round are carried forward into the final (shown in yellow).

Final standings

References

External links
Official Report

Freestyle 52kg